The Football Association Challenge Cup, more commonly known as the FA Cup, is an annual knockout football competition in men's domestic English football. First played during the 1871–72 season, it is the oldest national football competition in the world. It is organised by and named after The Football Association (The FA). Since 2015, it has been known as The Emirates FA Cup after its headline sponsor. A concurrent Women's FA Cup has been held since 1970.

The competition is open to all eligible clubs down to Level 9 of the English football league system with Level 10 clubs acting as stand-ins in the event of non-entries from above. Included in the competition are 20 professional clubs in the Premier League (level 1), 72 professional clubs in the English Football League (levels 2 to 4), and all clubs in steps 1–5 of the National League System (levels 5 to 9) as well as a tiny number of step 6 clubs acting as stand-ins for non-entries above. A record 763 clubs competed in 2011–12. The tournament consists of 12 randomly drawn rounds followed by the semi-finals and the final. Entrants are not seeded, although a system of byes based on league level ensures higher ranked teams enter in later rounds – the minimum number of games needed to win, depending on which round a team enters the competition, ranges from six to fourteen.

The first six rounds are the Qualifying Competition, from which 32 teams progress to the first round of the Competition Proper, meeting the first of the 48 professional teams from Leagues One and Two. The last entrants are the Premier League and Championship clubs, into the draw for the Third Round Proper. In the modern era, only one non-League team has ever reached the quarter-finals, and teams below Level 2 have never reached the final. As a result, significant focus is given to the smaller teams who progress furthest, especially if they achieve an unlikely "giant-killing" victory.

Winners receive the FA Cup trophy, of which there have been two designs and five actual cups; the latest is a 2014 replica of the second design, introduced in 1911. Winners also qualify for the UEFA Europa League and a place in the upcoming FA Community Shield. Arsenal are the most successful club with fourteen titles and Arsène Wenger is the most successful manager in the history of the competition, having won seven finals as Arsenal's manager.

Liverpool are the current holders, having beaten Chelsea 6–5 on penalties following a 0–0 draw in the 2022 final.

History

In 1863, the newly founded Football Association (the FA) published the Laws of the Game of Association Football, unifying the various different rules in use before then. On 20 July 1871, in the offices of The Sportsman newspaper, the FA Secretary C. W. Alcock proposed to the FA committee that "it is desirable that a Challenge Cup should be established in connection with the Association for which all clubs belonging to the Association should be invited to compete". The inaugural FA Cup tournament kicked off in November 1871. After thirteen games in all, Wanderers were crowned the winners in the final, on 16 March 1872. Wanderers retained the trophy the following year. The modern cup was beginning to be established by the 1888–89 season, when qualifying rounds were introduced.

Following the 1914–15 edition, the competition was suspended due to the First World War, and did not resume until 1919–20. The 1923 FA Cup Final, commonly known as the "White Horse Final", was the first final to be played in the newly opened Wembley Stadium (known at the time as the Empire Stadium). The 1927 final saw "Abide with Me" being sung for the first time at the Cup final, which has become a pre-match tradition. Due to the outbreak of World War II, the competition was not played between the 1938–39 and 1945–46 editions. Due to the wartime breaks, the competition did not celebrate its centenary year until 1980–81; fittingly the final featured a goal by Ricky Villa which was later voted the greatest goal ever scored in an FA Cup Final, but has since been replaced by Steven Gerrard.

Having previously featured replays, the modern day practice of ensuring the semi-final and final matches finish on the day was introduced in 2000. Redevelopment of Wembley saw the final played outside of England for the first time, the 2001–2006 finals being played at the Millennium Stadium in Cardiff. The final returned to Wembley in 2007, followed by the semi-finals from 2008. 

On 1 March 2023, Grimsby Town became the first team in FA Cup history to beat five teams from higher divisions following a 2-1 win at Southampton to advance to the quarter finals.

Eligibility

An application window is open to clubs before entry lists, round byes and scheduling are announced in July. All clubs in the top four levels (the Premier League and the three divisions of the English Football League) are automatically eligible. Clubs from Level 5-9 (non-league football) are also eligible provided they play in either the FA Trophy or FA Vase competitions in the current season. All participating clubs must also have a stadium suitable for the competition and The Association may reject applications at its discretion.

Previously, Level 10 clubs were a prominent feature in early qualifying rounds. The gradual remodelling of the National League System to a 'perfect' 1–2–4–8–16 system, with a first phase in 2018–19, a final phase in 2021–22 (which included the promotion of 107 clubs), and played to a full quota in 2022–23 has resulted in a larger number of teams playing in Level 7–9. Consequently for the FA Cup, entries equal the number in tiers 1–9 and is cut off to those below. Though still able to apply, Level 10 clubs are used as alternates "subject to availability" in the event of a non/rejected applicant (with vacancies filled by Level 10 applicants with the best PPG in the previous league season). 

The total number of entries in the FA Cup has changed as Non-League football has gradually been expanded and reorganised over time. In the 2004–05 season, 660 clubs entered the competition, beating the long-standing record of 656 from the 1921–22 season. In 2005–06 this increased to 674 entrants, in 2006–07 to 687, in 2007–08 to 731 clubs, in 2008–09 and 2009–10 to 762. The total number of entries has also varied naturally from year-to-year as new clubs form and others dissolve at unequal rates. Though most leagues in the National League System maintain the same number of teams via reprieves, inevitably entry-level divisions (typically at tier 10) have to be impacted when a club leaves the pyramid. Therefore, for example, 759 teams entered in 2010–11, a record 763 in 2011–12, 758 in 2012–13, 737 in 2013–14 and 736 in 2014–15. However, since 2021–22, The FA has cut off automatic eligibility to the 10th tier (to appear only subject to availability) and instead set the size of the draw to match the more stable number of teams in Level 1–9. This means that the competition may now see a standardised number of entries from one year to the next. This number is currently 732 but could rise to 748 for 2023–24 with plans for a new SWPL 9th tier division to share the South East with the existing Western League. 

It is very rare for top clubs to miss the competition, although it can happen in exceptional circumstances. Manchester United did not defend their title in 1999–2000, as they were already in the inaugural Club World Championship. The club stated that entering both tournaments would overload their fixture schedule and make it more difficult to defend their Champions League and Premier League titles. The club claimed that they did not want to devalue the FA Cup by fielding a weaker side. The move benefited United as they received a two-week break and won the 1999–2000 league title by an 18-point margin, although they did not progress past the group stage of the Club World Championship. The withdrawal from the FA Cup, however, drew considerable criticism as this weakened the tournament's prestige and Sir Alex Ferguson later admitted his regret regarding their handling of the situation.

Welsh sides that play in English leagues are eligible, although since the creation of the League of Wales there are only five clubs remaining: Cardiff City (the only non-English team to win the tournament, in 1927), Swansea City, Newport County, Wrexham, and Merthyr Town. In the early years other teams from Wales, Ireland and Scotland also took part in the competition, with Glasgow side Queen's Park losing the final to Blackburn Rovers in 1884 and 1885 before being barred from entering by the Scottish Football Association. 

Entries from clubs affiliated to "offshore" associations are also eligible subject to consideration on an annual basis, with special provisions that may apply. In the 2013–14 season the first Channel Island club entered the competition when Guernsey F.C. competed. The first game played in the Channel Islands – and thus the southernmost FA Cup tie played – took place on 7 August 2021 between Jersey Bulls and Horsham YMCA. A third club, F.C. Isle of Man, was also eligible to play in 2022–23, but in the end all Crown Dependency teams either did not appear on the entry list or later withdrew.

Competition format

Overview
Beginning in August, the competition proceeds as a knockout tournament throughout, consisting of twelve rounds, a semi-final and then a final, in May. A system of byes ensures clubs above Level 9 enter the competition at later stages. There is no seeding, the fixtures in each round being determined by a random draw. Prior to the fifth round, fixtures ending in a tie are replayed once only. The first six rounds are qualifiers, with the draws organised on a regional basis. The next six rounds are the "proper" rounds where all clubs are in one draw.

Schedule
All entrants from Level 9 begin the competition in the extra preliminary round, as well as any Level 10 team filling in for a vacancy. Teams from Level 8 are ranked on their PPG in the previous season, except newly promoted teams automatically ranked towards the bottom and newly relegated teams ranked to the top; teams are then split between entering at either the Extra-Preliminary or Preliminary Round so as to ensure the right balance of fixtures throughout the competition. From there, clubs from higher levels are added in later rounds, as per the table below. 

The months in which rounds are played are traditional, with exact dates subject to each calendar. The number of new entries, winners from previous rounds, and division of Level 8 teams in the two preliminary rounds are based on an entry list of 732 modelled on the English league system as of 2022–23. From 2023–24, the entry list could rise to 746 in line with sixteen additional clubs at Level 9 meaning that the extra preliminary round will have 444 teams with only 50 Level 8 clubs entering at the preliminary round.

The qualifying rounds are regionalised to reduce the travel costs for smaller non-league sides. The first and second proper rounds were also previously split into Northern and Southern sections, but this practice was ended after the 1997–98 competition. 

The final is normally held the Saturday after the Premier League season finishes in May. The only seasons in recent times when this pattern was not followed were: 1999–2000, when most rounds were played a few weeks earlier than normal as an experiment; 2010–11 and 2012–13 when the FA Cup Final was played before the Premier League season had finished, to allow Wembley Stadium to be ready for the UEFA Champions League final, as well as in 2011–12 to allow England time to prepare for that summer's European Championships; and 2019–20 when the final was delayed until August due to the COVID-19 pandemic in the United Kingdom.

Draws
The draws for the Extra Preliminary, Preliminary, and First Qualifying Rounds used to all occur at the same time. Thereafter, the draw for each subsequent round is not made until after the scheduled dates for the previous round, meaning that in the case of replays, clubs will often know their future opponents in advance.

The draw for each of the proper rounds is broadcast live on television, usually taking place at the conclusion of live coverage of one of the games of the previous round. Public interest is particularly high during the draw for the third round, which is where the top-ranked teams are added to the draw.

Tiebreaking
In rounds up to and including the Fourth Round Proper, fixtures resulting in a draw (after normal time) go to a replay, played at the venue of the away team, at a later date; if that replay is still tied, the winner is settled by a period of extra time, and if still necessary, a penalty shootout. Since 2016–17, ties have been settled on the day from the quarter-finals onwards, using extra time and penalties. From 2018–19, Fifth Round ties are also settled by extra time and penalties.

Until 1990–91, further replays would be played until one team was victorious. In 1971–72, a fourth qualifying round game between Alvechurch and Oxford City was played six times until Alvechurch won in the fifth replay. In their 1975 campaign, Fulham played 12 games over six rounds, which remains the most games played by a team to reach a final. Replays were traditionally played three or four days after the original game, but from 1991–92 they were staged at least 10 days later on police advice for the rounds proper. This led to penalty shoot-outs being introduced, the first of which came on 26 November 1991 when Rotherham United eliminated Scunthorpe United.

From 1980–81 to 1998–99, the semi-finals went to extra time on the day if the score after 90 minutes was a draw. If the score was still level after extra time, the match would go to a replay. Replays for the semi-finals were scrapped for 1999–2000; the last semi-final to go into a replay was in 1998–99, when Manchester United beat rivals Arsenal 2–1 after extra time, following a 0–0 draw in the original match.

The first FA Cup Final to go to extra time and a replay was the 1875 final, between the Royal Engineers and the Old Etonians. The initial tie finished 1–1 but the Royal Engineers won the replay 2–0 in normal time. The last replayed final was the 1993 FA Cup Final, when Arsenal and Sheffield Wednesday fought a 1–1 draw. The replay saw Arsenal win the FA Cup, 2–1 after extra time.

The last quarter-final to go to a replay was Manchester United vs West Ham United in the 2015–16 FA Cup. The original game at Old Trafford ended in a 1–1 draw, while Manchester United won the replay at the Boleyn Ground, 2–1. It was also the last FA Cup game ever played at the Boleyn Ground.

The last fifth round replay saw Tottenham Hotspur defeat Rochdale 6–1 at Wembley in the 2017–18 FA Cup after the first match at Spotland Stadium ended in a 2–2 draw.

Qualification for subsequent competitions

European football
The FA Cup winners qualify for the following season's UEFA Europa League (formerly named the UEFA Cup; from its launch in 1960 until 1998, they entered the now-defunct UEFA Cup Winners' Cup instead). This European place applies even if the team is relegated or is not in the English top flight. In the past, if the FA Cup winning team also qualified for the following season's Champions League or Europa League through their league or European performance, then the losing FA Cup finalists were given the European berth of the League Cup winners and the League Cup winners would be given the league berth instead (in the Cup Winners' Cup era, teams qualifying for the UEFA Cup via other competitions would be promoted to the Cup Winners' Cup instead). FA Cup winners enter the Europa League at the group stage. Losing finalists, if they had not qualified for Europe via the league, began earlier, at the play-off or third qualifying round stage. From the 2015–16 UEFA Europa League season, however, UEFA does not allow the runners-up to qualify for the Europa League through the competition. If the winner — and until 2015, the runner-up —
has already qualified for Europe through their league position (with the exception of the UEFA Cup until 1998), the FA Cup berth is then given to the highest-place team in the league who has not yet qualified.

FA Community Shield
The FA Cup winners also qualify for the following season's single-match FA Community Shield, the traditional season opener played against the previous season's Premier League champions (or the Premier League runners-up if the FA Cup winners also won the league – the double).

Venues

Fixtures in the 12 rounds of the competition are usually played at the home ground of one of the two teams. The semi-finals and final are played at a neutral venue – the rebuilt Wembley Stadium.

Competition rounds
In the matches for the 12 competition rounds, the team who plays at home is decided when the fixtures are drawn – simply the first team drawn out for each fixture. Occasionally games may have to be moved to other grounds due to other events taking place, security reasons or a ground not being suitable to host popular teams. However, since 2003, clubs cannot move grounds to the away side's for capacity or financial reasons. If any move has to be made, it has to be to a neutral venue and any additional monies earned by the move goes into the central pot. In the event of a draw, the replay is played at the ground of the team who originally played away from home.

In the days when multiple replays were possible, the second replay (and any further replays) were played at neutral grounds. The clubs involved could alternatively agree to toss for home advantage in the second replay.

Semi-finals

The semi-finals have been played exclusively at the rebuilt Wembley Stadium since 2008, one year after it opened and after it had already hosted a final (in 2007). For the first decade of the competition, the Kennington Oval was used as the semi-final venue. In the period between this first decade and the reopening of Wembley, semi-finals were played at high-capacity neutral venues around England; usually the home grounds of teams not involved in that semi-final, chosen to be roughly equidistant between the two teams for fairness of travel. The top three most used venues in this period were Villa Park in Birmingham (55 times), Hillsborough in Sheffield (34 times) and Old Trafford in Manchester (23 times). The original Wembley Stadium was also used seven times for semi-final, between 1991 and 2000 (the last held there), but not always for fixtures featuring London teams. In 2005, both were held at the Millennium Stadium.

In 2003 the FA took the decision to permanently use the new Wembley for semi-finals to recoup debts in financing the new stadium. This was controversial, with the move seen as both unfair to fans of teams located far from London, as well as taking some of the prestige away from a Wembley final. In defending the move, the FA has also cited the extra capacity Wembley offers, although the 2013 fixture between Millwall and Wigan Athletic led to the unprecedented step of placing 6,000 tickets on sale to neutral fans after the game failed to sell out. A fan poll by The Guardian in 2013 found 86% opposition to Wembley semi-finals.

Final

The final has been played at the rebuilt Wembley Stadium since it opened, in 2007. The rebuilding process meant that between 2001 and 2006 they were hosted at the Millennium Stadium in Cardiff in Wales. Prior to rebuilding, the final was hosted by the original Wembley Stadium since it opened in 1923 (being originally named the Empire Stadium). One exception to this 78 year series of Empire Stadium finals (including five replays) was the 1970 replay between Leeds United and Chelsea, held at Old Trafford in Manchester.

In the 51 years prior to the Empire Stadium opening, the final (including 8 replays) was held in a variety of locations, predominantly in London, and mainly at the Kennington Oval and then Crystal Palace. It was played 22 times at The Oval (the inaugural competition in 1872, and then all but two times until 1892). After The Oval, Crystal Palace hosted 21 finals from 1895 to 1914, broken up by four replays elsewhere. The other London venues were Stamford Bridge from 1920 to 1922 (the last three finals before the move to Empire Stadium); and the University of Oxford's Lillie Bridge in Fulham for the second ever final, in 1873. The other venues used sparingly in this period were all outside of London, as follows:
 Racecourse Ground, Derby (1886)
 Fallowfield Stadium, Manchester (1893)
 Goodison Park, Liverpool (1894)
 Burnden Park, Bolton (1901 replay)
 Goodison Park (1910 replay)
 Old Trafford, Manchester (1911 replay)
 Bramall Lane, Sheffield (1912 replay)
 Old Trafford (1915)

Artificial turf
The FA permitted artificial turf (3G) pitches in all rounds of the competition from the 2014–15 edition and beyond. Under the 2015–16 rules, the pitch must be of FIFA One Star quality, or Two Star for ties if they involve one of the 92 professional clubs. This followed approval two years previously for their use in the qualifying rounds only – if a team with a 3G pitch progressed to the competition proper, they had to switch their tie to the ground of another eligible entrant with a natural grass pitch. Having been strong proponents of the surface, the first match in the proper rounds to be played on a 3G surface was a televised first round replay at Maidstone United's Gallagher Stadium on 20 November 2014.

Trophy

The eventual winners of the competition receive the FA Cup. It is only loaned to the club by the FA; under the current (2015–16) rules it must be returned by 1 March, or earlier if given seven days' notice. Traditionally, the holders had the Cup until the following year's presentation, although more recently the trophy has been taken on publicity tours by the FA in between finals.

The trophy comes in three parts – the cup itself, plus a lid and a base. There have been two designs of trophy in use, but five physical trophies have been presented. The original trophy, known as the "little tin idol", was 18 inches high and made by Martin, Hall & Co. It was stolen in 1895 and never recovered, and so was replaced by an exact replica, used until 1910. The FA decided to change the design after the 1909 winners, Manchester United, made their own replica, leading the FA to realise they did not own the copyright. This new, larger design was by Fattorini and Sons, and was used from 1911. In order to preserve this original, from 1992 it was replaced by an exact replica, although this had to be replaced after just over two decades, after showing wear and tear from being handled more than in previous eras. This third replica, first used in 2014, was built heavier to withstand the increased handling. Of the four surviving trophies, only the 1895 replica has entered private ownership.
The name of the winning team is engraved on the silver band around the base as soon as the final has finished, in order to be ready in time for the presentation ceremony. This means the engraver has just five minutes to perform a task which would take 20 under normal conditions, although time is saved by engraving the year on during the match, and sketching the presumed winner. During the final, the trophy is decorated with ribbons in the colours of both finalists, with the loser's ribbons being removed at the end of the game. The tradition of tying ribbons started after Tottenham Hotspur won the 1901 FA Cup Final and the wife of a Spurs director decided to tie blue and white ribbons to the handles of the cup. Traditionally, at Wembley finals, the presentation is made at the Royal Box, with players, led by the captain, mounting a staircase to a gangway in front of the box and returning by a second staircase on the other side of the box. At Cardiff the presentation was made on a podium on the pitch.

The tradition of presenting the trophy immediately after the game did not start until the 1882 final; after the first final in 1872 the trophy was not presented to the winners, Wanderers, until a reception held four weeks later in the Pall Mall Restaurant in London. Under the original rules, the trophy was to be permanently presented to any club which won the competition three times, although when inaugural winners Wanderers achieved this feat by the 1876 final, the rules were changed by FA Secretary CW Alcock (who was also captain of Wanderers in their first victory).

Portsmouth have the distinction of being the football club which has held the FA Cup trophy for the longest uninterrupted period - seven years. Portsmouth had defeated Wolverhampton Wanderers 4–1 in the 1939 FA Cup Final and were awarded the trophy as 1938–39 FA Cup winners. But with the outbreak of World War II in September 1939, the regular Football League and FA Cup competitions for the 1939–40 season were cancelled for the duration of the war. Portsmouth's manager Jack Tinn was rumoured to have kept the FA Cup trophy 'safe under his bed' throughout the duration of the war, but this is an urban myth. Because the naval city of Portsmouth was a primary strategic military target for German Luftwaffe bombing, the FA Cup trophy was actually taken ten miles to the north of Portsmouth, to the nearby Hampshire village of Lovedean, and there it resided in a quaint thatched roof country pub called The Bird in Hand for the seven years of the war. After the conclusion of World War II, the FA Cup trophy was presented back to the Football Association by the club in time for the 1946 FA Cup Final.

Original design from 1871

1871 original
The first trophy, the 'little tin idol', was made by Martin, Hall & Co at a cost of £20. It was stolen from a Birmingham shoe shop window belonging to William Shillcock while held by Aston Villa on 11 September 1895 and was never seen again. Despite a £10 reward for information, the crime was never solved. As it happened while it was in their care, the FA fined Villa £25 to pay for a replacement.

Just over 60 years later, 80 year old career criminal Henry (Harry) James Burge claimed to have committed the theft, confessing to a newspaper, with the story being published in the Sunday Pictorial newspaper on 23 February 1958. He claimed to have carried out the robbery with two other men, although when discrepancies with a contemporaneous report in the Birmingham Post newspaper (the crime pre-dated written police reports) in his account of the means of entry and other items stolen, detectives decided there was no realistic possibility of a conviction and the case was closed. Burge claimed the cup had been melted down to make counterfeit half-crown coins, which matched known intelligence of the time, in which stolen silver was being used to forge coins which were then laundered through betting shops at a local racecourse, although Burge had no history of forgery in a record of 42 previous convictions for which he had spent 42 years in prison. He had been further imprisoned in 1957 for seven years for theft from cars. Released in 1961, he died in 1964.

1895 replica

After the theft, a replica of the trophy was made, which was used until a redesign of the trophy in 1911. The 1895 replica was then presented to the FA's long-serving president Lord Kinnaird. Kinnaird died in 1923, and his family kept it in their possession, out of view, until putting it up for auction in 2005. It was sold at Christie's auction house on 19 May 2005 for £420,000 (£478,400 including auction fees and taxes). The sale price set a new world record for a piece of football memorabilia, surpassing the £254,000 paid for the Jules Rimet World Cup Trophy in 1997. The successful bidder was David Gold, the then joint chairman of Birmingham City; claiming the FA and government were doing nothing proactive to ensure the trophy remained in the country, Gold stated his purchase was motivated by wanting to save it for the nation. Accordingly, Gold presented the trophy to the National Football Museum in Preston on 20 April 2006, where it went on immediate public display. It later moved with the museum to its new location in Manchester. In November 2012, it was ceremonially presented to Royal Engineers, after they beat Wanderers 7–1 in a charity replay of the first FA Cup final. In September 2020, Gold sold the replica trophy for £760,000 through the Bonhams auction house. In January 2021, it was revealed that the trophy had been purchased by Sheikh Mansour bin Zayed Al Nahyan, the owner of Manchester City, who stated that it would be returned on loan to the National Football Museum.

Current design from 1911

1911 original

The redesigned trophy first used in 1911 was larger at 61.5 cm (24.2 inches) high, and was designed and manufactured by Fattorini & Sons of Bradford, coincidentally being won by Bradford City in its first outing.

On the 27 March 2016 episode of the BBC television programme Antiques Roadshow, this trophy was valued at £1 million by expert Alastair Dickenson, although he suggested that, due to the design featuring depictions of grapes and vines, it may not have been specifically produced for the FA, but was instead an off-the-shelf design originally meant to be a wine or champagne cooler. This was later disproved when Thomas Fattorini was invited to the Antiques Roadshow to "ambush" Alastair Dickenson with the competition winning design by Fattorini & Sons. The show was filmed at Baddesley Clinton and subsequentially aired on 23 October 2016.

A smaller, but otherwise identical, replica was also made by the company Thomas Fattorini, the North Wales Coast FA Cup trophy, and is contested annually by members of that regional Association.

1992 replica
The 1992 replica was made by Toye, Kenning and Spencer. A copy of this trophy was also produced, in case anything happened to the primary trophy.

2014 replica
The 2014 replica was made by Thomas Lyte, handcrafted in sterling 925 silver over 250 hours.

Medals
Each club in the final receives 40 winners or runners-up medals to be distributed among players, staff and officials. The traditional styles of gold-cased medals – the winners' medal, which had remained largely unchanged since the 1890s, and runners-up medals, which were last updated in 1946 – were replaced for the 2021 final by new designs of gold winners' medals and silver runners-up medals suspended on a ribbon.

Sponsorship

Since the start of the 1994–95 season, the FA Cup has been sponsored. However, to protect the identity of the competition, the sponsored name has always included 'The FA Cup' in addition to the sponsor's name, unlike sponsorship deals for the League Cup where the word 'cup' is preceded by only the sponsor's name. Sponsorship deals run for four years, though – as in the case of E.ON – one-year extensions may be agreed. Emirates Airline has been the sponsor since 2015, initially renaming the competition as 'The Emirates FA Cup', unlike previous editions, which included 'The FA Cup in association with E.ON' and 'The FA Cup with Budweiser'. The Emirates sponsorship deal, originally scheduled to terminate in 2018, was later extended until 2021.

From 2006 to 2013, Umbro supplied match balls for all FA Cup matches. They were replaced at the start of the 2013–14 season by Nike, who produced the competition's official match ball for five seasons. Mitre took over for the 2018–19 season, beginning a three-year partnership with the FA.

Records and statistics

Final

Team
Most wins: 14, Arsenal (1930, 1936, 1950, 1971, 1979, 1993, 1998, 2002, 2003, 2005, 2014, 2015, 2017, 2020)
Most consecutive wins: 3, joint record:
Wanderers (1876, 1877, 1878)
Blackburn Rovers (1884, 1885, 1886)
Most appearances in a final: 21, Arsenal (1927, 1930, 1932, 1936, 1950, 1952, 1971, 1972, 1978, 1979, 1980, 1993, 1998, 2001, 2002, 2003, 2005, 2014, 2015, 2017, 2020)
Most consecutive finals losses: 3
Chelsea (2020, 2021, 2022)
Most Final appearances without ever winning: 2, joint record: 
Queen's Park (1884, 1885)
Birmingham City (1931, 1956)
Crystal Palace (1990, 2016)
Watford (1984, 2019)
Most Final appearances without ever losing: 5, Wanderers (1872, 1873, 1876, 1877, 1878)
Most Final appearances without losing (streak): 7, joint record:
Tottenham Hotspur (1901, 1921, 1961, 1962, 1967, 1981, 1982)
Arsenal (2002, 2003, 2005, 2014, 2015, 2017, 2020)
 Longest gap between wins: 69 years, Portsmouth (1939–2008)
Biggest win: 6 goals, joint record: 
Bury 6–0 Derby County (1903)
Manchester City 6–0 Watford (2019)
Most goals in a final: 7:
Blackburn Rovers 6–1 Sheffield Wednesday (1890)
Blackpool 4–3 Bolton Wanderers (1953)
Most goals by a losing side: 3:
Bolton Wanderers: Lost 3–4 against Blackpool (1953)
West Ham United: Drew 3–3 but lost in a penalty shootout against Liverpool (2006)
Most defeats in a final: 8, joint record:
Everton (1893, 1897, 1907, 1968, 1985, 1986, 1989, 2009)
Manchester United (1957, 1958, 1976, 1979, 1995, 2005, 2007, 2018)
Chelsea (1915, 1967, 1994, 2002, 2017, 2020, 2021, 2022)

Individual

Most wins by player: 7: Ashley Cole (Arsenal) (2002, 2003, 2005) & (Chelsea) (2007, 2009, 2010, 2012)
Most wins by manager: 7, Arsène Wenger (Arsenal) (1998, 2002, 2003, 2005, 2014, 2015, 2017)
Most appearances: 9, Arthur Kinnaird (Wanderers) (1872–73, 1875–76, 1876–77, 1877–78) & (Old Etonians) (1874–75, 1878–79, 1880–81, 1881–82, 1882–83)
Most goals (one final): 3:
Billy Townley (Blackburn Rovers) (1890)
James Logan (Notts County) (1894)
Stan Mortensen (Blackpool) (1953)
Most goals (all finals): 5, Ian Rush (Liverpool) (2 in 1986, 2 in 1989, 1 in 1992)
Most finals scored in: 4, Didier Drogba (Chelsea) (1 each in 2007, 2009, 2010, 2012)
Youngest FA Cup finalist: Curtis Weston (Millwall), 17 years and 119 days (2004)
Youngest player to score in an FA Cup Final: Norman Whiteside (Manchester United), 18 years and 19 days (1983)
Oldest player: Billy Hampson (Newcastle United), 41 years and 257 days (1924)

All rounds
Biggest win: Preston North End 26–0 Hyde (First Round, 15 October 1887)
Biggest away win: Clapton 0–14 Nottingham Forest (First Round, 17 January 1891)
Highest attendance at Wembley: 126,047 (official) up to 300,000 (estimate) at the "White Horse Final" (Bolton Wanderers v. West Ham United, 28 April 1923)
Most clubs competing for trophy in a season: 763 (2011–12)
Longest tie: 660 minutes (6 matches in total), Oxford City v. Alvechurch (Fourth Qualifying Round, November 6/9/15/17/20/22 1971; Alvechurch won the sixth match 1–0)
Longest penalty shoot-out: 20 penalties each, Tunbridge Wells v. Littlehampton Town (Preliminary Round Replay, 31 August 2005; Tunbridge Wells won 16–15)
Most rounds played in a season: 9, for:
Brighton & Hove Albion (1932–33: 1st–4th Qualifying Rounds, 1st–5th Rounds)
New Brighton (1956–57: Preliminary, 1st–4th Qualifying Rounds, 1st–4th Rounds)
Blyth Spartans (1977–78: 1st–4th Qualifying Rounds, 1st–5th Rounds)
Harlow Town (1979–80: Preliminary, 1st–4th Qualifying Rounds, 1st–4th Rounds)
Most games played in a season: 13, Bideford (1973–74: one First Qualifying, two Second Qualifying, five Third Qualifying, four Fourth Qualifying and one First Round)
Fastest goal: 4 seconds, Gareth Morris (for Ashton United v. Skelmersdale United, 1st Qualifying Round, 17 September 2001)
Most consecutive games without defeat: 22, Blackburn Rovers (First Round, 1884 through Second round, replay, 1886. Won three FA Cups.) 
Fastest hat-trick: 2 min 20 sec, Andy Locke (for Nantwich Town v. Droylsden, Preliminary Round, August 1995)
Most career goals: 49 Harry Cursham (for Notts County in 12 tournaments from 1877–78 to 1888–89).
Most goals by a player in a single FA Cup season: 19, Jimmy Ross (for Preston North End, 1887–88. Preston outscored opponents 50–5 over 7 matches, including "Biggest win" shown above.).
Most goals by a player in a single FA Cup game: 9, Ted MacDougall (for AFC Bournemouth in 11–0 defeat of Margate, First Round Proper, 20 November 1971)
Scoreline: Two examples of teams scoring 7 goals and not winning – Dulwich Hamlet 8–7 St Albans City (Fourth Qualifying Round Replay, 22 November 1922), and Dulwich Hamlet 7–7 Wealdstone (Fourth Qualifying Round, 16 November 1929).
Youngest player: Andy Awford, 15 years and 88 days (for Worcester City v. Boreham Wood, 3rd Qualifying Round, 10 October 1987).
Youngest goalscorer: Finn Smith, 16 years and 1 day (for Newport (IOW) F.C. v. Fleet Town, Extra Preliminary Round, 2 August 2022).
Youngest goalscorer (proper rounds): George Williams, 16 years and 66 days (for Milton Keynes Dons v. Nantwich Town, First Round Proper, 12 November 2011).
 Biggest gap between two teams in an FA Cup match: 161 difference in rank between 8th-tier Marine and Premier League Tottenham Hotspur, Third Round Proper, 10 January 2021.

Cup runs and giant killings
The possibility of unlikely victories in the earlier rounds of the competition, where lower ranked teams beat higher placed opposition in what is known as a "giant killing", is much anticipated by the public. Such upsets are considered an integral part of the tradition and prestige of the competition, and the attention gained by giant-killing teams can be as great as that for winners of the cup. Almost every club in the League Pyramid has a fondly remembered giant-killing act in its history. It is considered particularly newsworthy when a top Premier League team suffers an upset defeat, or where the giant-killer is a non-league club, i.e. from outside The Football League.

One analysis of four years of FA Cup results showed that it was 99.85 per cent likely that at least one team would beat one from its next higher division in a given year. The probability drops to 48.8 per cent for a two-division gap, and 39.28 per cent for a three-division gap.

Early years
The Football League was founded in 1888, 16 years after the first FA Cup competition. Before its establishment as the dominant football competition in England, teams from rival leagues did make the final of the FA Cup. The Wednesday (later Sheffield Wednesday) in 1890 reached the final as a member of the Football Alliance, two years before that competition merged with the Football League.  Later, with the Football League predominantly in the North and Midlands of England, leading clubs of the Southern Football League were of a level with Football League teams, and in 1901 Southern League members Tottenham Hotspur became the only non-League side to win the Cup,  while fellow Southern League team Southampton were losing finalists in 1900 and 1902. In 1920–21, the Football League expanded to incorporate teams from the Southern League's first division, and the following year it added a further division consisting of leading northern and midlands clubs. This consolidated the Football League's position as the leading competition in English football, and established the hierarchy in which non-League clubs in the English football league system competing in the FA Cup would face Football League teams as clear underdogs.

Non-League giant killings
Since the expansion of the Football League in 1921, the best performance of a team from outside the Football League was National League side Lincoln City's run to the quarter-finals of the 2016–17 FA Cup, during which they defeated Premier League side Burnley, the most recent victory for a non-league team over a top-flight side. Such victories are rare; there have been only three since 1989. Giant-killings can also be applied where the defeated team is from lower down the Football League, particularly where the defeated club is very notable or the winning team particularly obscure. Liverpool, having already won five league titles in their history, were in the Second Division in 1959 when they lost 2–1 to Worcester City of the Southern League.

The best-known non-league giant-killing came in the 1971–72 FA Cup, when non-league Hereford United defeated First Division Newcastle United.  Hereford were trailing 1–0 with less than seven minutes left in the Third Round Proper replay, when Hereford's Ronnie Radford scored the equaliser – a goal still shown regularly when FA Cup fixtures are broadcast.  Hereford finished the shocking comeback by defeating Newcastle 2–1 in the match. They finished that season as runners-up of the Southern League, behind Chelmsford City, and were voted into the Football League at the expense of Barrow. 

Some small clubs gain a reputation for being "cup specialists" after two or more giant killing feats within a few years. Yeovil Town hold the record for the most victories over league opposition as a non-league team, having recorded 20 wins through the years before they achieved promotion into The Football League in 2003. The record for a club which has never entered the Football League is held by Altrincham, with 17 wins against league teams.

Non-League cup runs

For non-League teams, reaching the Third Round Proper – where all Level 1 sides now enter – is considered a major achievement. In the 2008–09 FA Cup, a record eight non-League teams achieved this feat. As of the 2021–22 season, only ten non-League teams have reached the Fifth Round Proper (final 16) since 1945, and only Lincoln City have progressed to the Sixth Round (final 8), during the 2016–17 edition of the tournament.

Chasetown, while playing at Level 8 of English football during the 2007–08 competition, were the lowest-ranked team to ever play in the Third Round Proper (final 64, of 731 teams entered that season). Chasetown was then a member of the Southern League Division One Midlands (a lower level within the Southern Football League), when they lost to Football League Championship (Level 2) team Cardiff City, the eventual FA Cup runners-up that year. Their success earned the lowly organisation over £60,000 in prize money. Marine matched this in the 2020–21 competition as a member of the Northern Premier League Division One North West, and were drawn against Premier League (Level 1) team Tottenham Hotspur, whom they lost to 5–0.

Giant killings between League clubs
Giant-killings can apply to matches between league clubs, particularly where teams from tier 4 have defeated tier 1 sides. In games between League sides, one of the most notable results was the 1992 victory by Wrexham, bottom of the previous season's League (avoiding relegation due to expansion of The Football League), over reigning champions Arsenal. Another similar shock was when Shrewsbury Town beat Everton 2–1 in 2003. Everton finished seventh in the Premier League and Shrewsbury Town were relegated to the Football Conference that same season.

During the 2022-23 tournament, Grimsby Town who were 16th in EFL League Two won 2-1 away at Premier League side Southampton to advance into the quarter finals.

Winners and finalists

Results by team
Since its establishment, the FA Cup has been won by 44 different teams. Teams shown in italics are no longer in existence. Additionally, Queen's Park ceased to be eligible to enter the FA Cup after a Scottish Football Association ruling in 1887.

Consecutive winners
Four clubs have won consecutive FA Cups on more than one occasion: Wanderers (1872, 1873 and 1876, 1877, 1878), Blackburn Rovers (1884, 1885, 1886 and 1890, 1891), Tottenham Hotspur (1961, 1962 and 1981, 1982) and Arsenal (2002, 2003 and 2014, 2015).

Winning managers

The record for most titles for a manager is held by Arsène Wenger, who won the FA Cup with Arsenal seven times (1998, 2002, 2003, 2005, 2014, 2015, 2017). Wenger is also the only manager to have won the Cup at the old Wembley Stadium, the Millennium Stadium, and the new Wembley Stadium.

Doubles/Trebles
Manchester United (1999) are the only English team to have won the treble in the traditional definition, commonly referred to as the continental treble, winning league, cup, and Champions League. They are to date one of only eight European sides to do so. Manchester City (2019) are the only club to have achieved a domestic treble of league, FA Cup and EFL Cup, having beaten Chelsea 4–3 on penalties in the EFL Cup Final, finished at the top of the Premier League, and beaten Watford 6–0 in the FA Cup Final. Note that the domestic treble is often regarded as separate to the treble as many European sides do not have a league cup competition equivalent. Liverpool (2001) won the FA Cup, League Cup and UEFA Cup to complete a cup treble.

Eight clubs have won the FA Cup as part of a League and Cup double, namely Preston North End (1889), Aston Villa (1897), Tottenham Hotspur (1961), Arsenal (1971, 1998, 2002), Liverpool (1986), Manchester United (1994, 1996, 1999),Chelsea (2010) and Manchester City F.C(2019). In 1993, Arsenal became the first side to win both the FA Cup and the League Cup in the same season when they beat Sheffield Wednesday 2–1 in both finals. Liverpool (2001, 2022), Chelsea (in 2007) and Manchester City (2019) have since repeated this feat. In 2012, Chelsea accomplished a different cup double consisting of the FA Cup and the 2012 Champions League.

Outside England
The FA Cup has only been won by a non-English team once. Cardiff City achieved this in 1927 when they beat Arsenal in the final at Wembley. They had previously made it to the final only to lose to Sheffield United in 1925 and lost another final to Portsmouth in 2008. Cardiff City are also the only team to win the national cups of two different countries in the same season, having also won the Welsh Cup in 1927. The Scottish team Queen's Park reached and lost the final in both 1884 and 1885.

Outside the top division
Since the creation of the Football League in 1888, the final has never been contested by two teams from outside the top division, and there have only been eight winners who were not in the top flight: Notts County (1894); Tottenham Hotspur (1901); Wolverhampton Wanderers (1908); Barnsley (1912); West Bromwich Albion (1931); Sunderland (1973), Southampton (1976) and West Ham United (1980). With the exception of Tottenham, these clubs were all playing in the second tier (the old Second Division) – Tottenham were playing in the Southern League and were only elected to the Football League in 1908, meaning they are the only non-League winners of the FA Cup since the League's creation. Other than Tottenham's victory, only 24 finalists have come from outside English football's top tier, with a record of 7 wins and 17 runners-up: and none at all from the third tier or lower, Southampton (1902, then in the Southern League) being the last finalist from outside the top two tiers.

Sunderland's win in 1973 was considered a major upset, having beaten Leeds United who finished third in the top flight that season, as was West Ham's victory over Arsenal in 1980 as the Gunners were in their third successive FA Cup Final and were also the cup holders from the previous year as well as just having finished 4th in the First Division, whereas West Ham had ended the season 7th in Division 2. This also marked the last time (as of 2021–22) a team from outside the top division won the FA Cup. Uniquely, in 2008 three of the four semi-finalists (Barnsley, Cardiff City and West Bromwich) were from outside the top division, although the eventual winner was the last remaining top-flight team, Portsmouth. West Bromwich (1931) are the only team to have won the FA Cup and earned promotion to the top flight in the same season; whereas Wigan Athletic (2013) are the only team to have won the Cup and been relegated from the top flight in the same season.

Media coverage

Domestic broadcasters

The FA Cup Final is one of 10 events reserved for live broadcast on UK terrestrial television under the Ofcom Code on Sports and Other Listed and Designated Events.

In the early years of coverage the BBC had exclusive radio coverage with a picture of the pitch marked in the Radio Times with numbered squares to help the listener follow the match on the radio. The first FA Cup Final on Radio was in 1926 between Bolton Wanderers and Manchester City but this was only broadcast in Manchester, the first national final on BBC Radio was between Arsenal and Cardiff City in 1927. The first final on BBC Television was in 1937 in a match which featured Sunderland and Preston North End but this was not televised in full. The following season's final between Preston and Huddersfield Town was covered in full by the BBC. When ITV was formed in 1955 they shared final coverage with the BBC in one of the only club matches shown live on television, during the 1970s and 1980s coverage became more elaborate with BBC and ITV trying to steal viewers from the others by starting coverage earlier and earlier some starting as early as 9 a.m. which was six hours before kick off. The sharing of rights between BBC and ITV continued from 1955 to 1988, when ITV lost coverage to the BBC.

From 1988 to 1997, the BBC was the exclusive broadcaster of the competition on terrestrial television and covered the competition from the third round onwards, showing one live match per round alongside highlights. In 1990, British Satellite Broadcasting (BSB) obtained rights to the competition, and showed a live match from rounds 1 and 2. This continued to be the case after Sky took over BSB in 1991.

From 1997 to 2001, ITV and Sky shared live coverage with both having two matches per round and BBC continuing with highlights on Match of the Day. From 2001 to 2008, BBC and Sky again shared coverage with BBC having two or three matches per round and Sky having one or two. From 2008–09 to 2013–14, FA Cup matches are shown live by ITV across England and Wales, with UTV broadcasting to Northern Ireland but STV refusing to show them. ITV shows 16 FA Cup games per season, including the first pick of live matches from each of the first to sixth rounds of the competition, plus one semi-final exclusively live. The final is also shown live on ITV. Under the same 2008 contract, Setanta Sports showed three games and one replay in each round from round three to five, two quarter-finals, one semi-final and the final. The channel also broadcast ITV's matches exclusively to Scotland, after the ITV franchise holder in Scotland, STV, decided not to broadcast FA Cup games. Setanta entered administration in June 2009 and as a result the FA terminated Setanta's deal to broadcast FA-sanctioned competitions and England internationals. As a result of Setanta going out of business ITV showed the competition exclusively in the 2009–10 season with between three and four matches per round, all quarter finals, semi-finals and final live as the FA could not find a pay TV broadcaster in time. ESPN bought the competition for the 2010–11 to 2012–13 season and during this time Rebecca Lowe became the first woman to host the FA Cup Final in the UK.

In October 2009, The FA announced that ITV would show an additional match in the First and Second Rounds on ITV, with one replay match shown on ITV4. One match and one replay match from the first two rounds will broadcast on The FA website for free, in a similar situation to the 2010 World Cup Qualifier between Ukraine and England. The 2009–10 First Round match between Oldham Athletic and Leeds United was the first FA Cup match to be streamed online live.

Many expected BSkyB to make a bid to show some of the remaining FA Cup games for the remainder of the 2009–10 season which would include a semi-final and shared rights to the final. ESPN took over the package Setanta held for the FA Cup from the 2010–11 season. The 2011 final was also shown live on Sky 3D in addition to ESPN (who provided the 3D coverage for Sky 3D) and ITV. Following the sale of ESPN's UK and Ireland channels to BT, ESPN's rights package transferred to BT Sport from the 2013–14 season.

BBC Radio 5 Live and Talksport provides radio coverage including several full live commentaries per round, with additional commentaries broadcast on BBC Local Radio.

Until the 2008–09 season, the BBC and Sky Sports shared television coverage, with the BBC showing three matches in the earlier rounds. Some analysts argued the decision to move away from the Sky and, in particular, the BBC undermined the FA Cup in the eyes of the public.

The early rounds of the 2008–09 competition were covered for the first time by ITV's online service, ITV Local. The first match of the competition, between Wantage Town and Brading Town, was broadcast live online. Highlights of eight games of each round were broadcast as catch up on ITV Local. Since ITV Local closed, this coverage did not continue.

ITV lost the rights to the FA Cup beginning with the 2014–15 FA Cup, terrestrial rights returned to BBC Sport, with the final being shown on BBC One while BT Sport hold the pay TV rights. Under this deal, the BBC will show around the same number of games as ITV and still having the first pick for each round.

Matches involving Welsh clubs are sometimes exclusively broadcast on Welsh language channel S4C, which is also available to view across the rest of the United Kingdom on satellite and cable television, and through the channel's website. A similar arrangement is shared with BBC Cymru Wales from 2014 to 2015, potentially giving the BBC an extra match per round.

On 23 May 2019, it was announced that ITV would replace BT Sport in broadcasting the FA Cup from the 2021–22 season, this new deal will see BBC and ITV become joint broadcasters of the tournament for the first time since 1990, this will mean for the first time that all FA Cup matches would all be exclusively broadcast on free-to-air television.

Overseas broadcasters

The FA sells overseas rights separately from the domestic contract.

References

Notes

External links

 
 Thomas Fattorini Ltd. makers of the 1911 FA Cup – manufacturers of the 1911 FA Cup and other sporting trophies
 FA Cup going under the hammer – BBC News story on the sale of the second trophy
 FA Supporters – Independent FA Cup Supporters Club

 
Recurring sporting events established in 1871
1
National association football cups
1871 establishments in England
Professional sports leagues in the United Kingdom